The Palawan supple skink (Lygosoma tabonorum) is a species of skink found in the Philippines.

References

Lygosoma
Reptiles described in 2016
Reptiles of the Philippines
Endemic fauna of the Philippines
Taxa named by Brendan B. Heitz
Taxa named by Arvin Cantor Diesmos
Taxa named by Elyse S. Freitas
Taxa named by Elyse D. Ellsworth
Taxa named by Larry Lee Grismer